Igreja de Santo André may refer to:

 Igreja de Santo André (Mafra), a church in Portugal
 Igreja de Santo André (Vila Boa de Quires), a church in Portugal